Ziggy's Gift is a 1982 American animated holiday television special based on the Ziggy comics. Directed by Richard Williams, the special first aired December 1, 1982, on ABC.

Production
Written by Ziggy cartoonist Tom Wilson, the special includes animation by Eric Goldberg and Tom Sito.  The original song "Give, Love, Joy" was composed by Harry Nilsson.

Premise
Ziggy takes a job as a street Santa to raise money for the poor, accompanied by his faithful dog Fuzz. Surrounded by crooked Santas, sneaky thieves, and a suspicious cop, Ziggy remains honest and kind (while speaking no dialogue).

Accolades
Ziggy's Gift won the 1983 Emmy Award for Outstanding Animated Program.

See also
 List of Christmas films

References

External links
 
 	

1982 in American television
1982 television specials
1980s American television specials
American Broadcasting Company television specials
1980s animated television specials
Christmas television specials
1980s English-language films
Films directed by Richard Williams
American animated short films
Television shows based on comic strips
Emmy Award-winning programs
American Christmas television specials
Animated Christmas television specials
Films produced by Richard Williams (animator)